The Peconic Bay is the parent name for two bays between the North Fork and South Fork of Long Island in the U.S. state of New York. It is separated from Gardiners Bay by Shelter Island.

Peconic Bay is divided by Robins Island into the Great Peconic Bay on the west and Little Peconic Bay on the east. The west end of Great Peconic Bay is also called Flanders Bay. The Shinnecock Canal provides access from the Great Peconic Bay to Shinnecock Bay. The two Peconic Bays are often collectively referred to as "the Peconics".

The Peconics are a tidal estuary system fed at the western end by the Peconic River. Other notable tidal estuary creeks which provide brackish water to the system are Meeting House Creek, Brushes Creek, James Creek, and Deep Hole Creek on the North Fork. These and others bring lesser salinity to the water compared to the Atlantic Ocean. For that reason, the clams, oysters and bay scallops were numerous for generations since they require brackish water and the bountiful phyto and zooplankton which give the system its first tier of life.  Reseeding of shellfish in 2005 and 2006 and leasing of the bottom to commercial farmers for clams and oysters have given rise to hope for the ecosystem.

The winter flounder fishing usually caught in the spring has all but collapsed, but fluke (summer flounder), bluefish, porgy  (scup) and some northern weakfish are to be found, using clams, squid and spearing for bait. Snappers (young spawned bluefish of the year) give youngsters a real thrill in late summer. August is a time of blue claw crabbing and recent catches 2006 and 2007 in the inlets and creeks have been bountiful.

A boaters' paradise for its calm waters in summer and fresh sou'westers in late afternoon for sailing has become a popular vacation spot for New Yorkers and East coasters.

Peconic Bay gives its name to the proposed Peconic County, New York, which would comprise the eastern portion of existing Suffolk County that surrounds Peconic Bay. While this movement to split Suffolk County along economic lines (the Western portion is more suburban in character, while the Eastern portion is more rural) has a long history, it has not been active since 1998.

See also
Long Island
Suffolk County, New York
Holland Torpedo Boat Station

References

External links

 Peconic Bay Anglers- A fishing club dedicated to anglers of the Peconic Bays and surrounding waters.
 Images
 Nautical chart of Great Peconic Bay

Bays of New York (state)
Riverhead (town), New York
Shelter Island (town), New York
Southampton (town), New York
Southold, New York
Bays of Suffolk County, New York